Sameer Athalye is an Indian cinematographer from Mumbai, Maharashtra. He has worked for more than 200 Hindi and Marathi movies since the 1990s. He is married to actress Alka Kubal.

Filmography
Kay Dyache Bola (2005)
Khatarnak (2000)
Jigar (1998)
Aisi Bhi Kya Jaldi Hai (1996) (as Sameer Athlye)
Veer Savarkar
 Navari Mile Navaryala
 Dhumdhadaka
Masoom (1996)

External links
 

Cinematographers from Maharashtra
Living people
Year of birth missing (living people)